Year 1136 (MCXXXVI) was a leap year starting on Wednesday (link will display the full calendar) of the Julian calendar.

Events 
 By place 

 Levant 
 Spring – Raymond of Poitiers, son of the late Duke William IX of Aquitaine, arrives at Antioch. Patriarch Ralph of Domfront (against the wishes of Princess Alice) arranges a marriage in secret with her 8-year-old daughter Constance. She is kidnapped and taken to the cathedral in Antioch, where Ralph hastily marries her to Raymond. Alice leaves the city, now under the control of Raymond and Ralph, and retires to Latakia, Syria.
 August 17 – Al-Rashid is deposed after a 1-year reign and flees to Isfahan (modern Iran). He is succeeded by his uncle Al-Muqtafi who becomes the new caliph of the Abbasid Caliphate in Baghdad (until 1160).

 Europe 
 May 28 – In Russia, the people of Novgorod depose and imprison Prince Vsevolod of Pskov. Novgorod asserts its independence from Kiev, but accepts protection from neighboring Kievan princes. In July, Vsevolod along with his wife and family are released (they are exiled to an uncle in Kiev).
 Summer – Emperor Lothair III invades southern Italy in response to the appeal of Emperor John II Komnenos (see 1135) and conquers Apulia from King Roger II of Sicily. Duke Grimoald of Bari, supported by Lothair III, rebels against Roger.
 December 14 – King Harald IV of Norway is murdered by Sigurd Slembe, an illegitimate son of the late King Magnus Barefoot. He is succeeded by his sons Inge I ("the Hunchback) and his 3-year-old half-brother Sigurd II.

 England 
 Spring – King David I of Scotland invades northern England and captures many of the major towns including Carlisle and Newcastle. In response, King Stephen raises an army (with Flemish mercenaries), and marches to Durham. David agrees to negotiate a peace between the two countries.
 February 5 – Treaty of Durham: A peace treaty is signed by Stephen and David I. The Scots are allowed to keep Carlisle and a part of Cumberland in return for stopping their advance. David refuses an oath of allegiance, as his loyalties rest with Matilda (daughter of the late King Henry I).
 October – Battle of Crug Mawr (Great Barrow): King Owain Gwynedd (styled "Prince of Wales") defeats the Norman and Flemish forces under Robert Fitz Martin, securing the control of Ceredigion (West Wales).

 Africa 
 The city of Béjaïa (modern Algeria) repeals a Genoan naval assault.

 Asia 
 Sultan Mudzaffar Shah I establishes the Kedah Sultanate at Qodah Darul Aman (modern-day Kedah Darul Aman, Malaysia).

 By topic 

 Arts and Culture 
 The Basilica of Saint-Denis is completed to designs by Abbot Suger in Paris, France.
 Peter Abelard writes the Historia Calamitatum, detailing his relationship with Heloise.

 Religion 
 Hildegard of Bingen becomes abbess of the Benedictine monastery of Disibodenberg, upon the death of Jutta von Sponheim.
 Worship at the original Glasgow Cathedral in Scotland begins.
 Melrose Abbey (located in the Scottish Borders) is founded by Cistercian monks at the request of David.

Births 
 July 22 – William of Anjou, viscount of Dieppe (d. 1164)
 Amalric I (or Amalricus), king of Jerusalem (d. 1174)
 Humbert III (the Blessed), count of Savoy (d. 1189)
 Ismail al-Jazari, Artuqid polymath and inventor (d. 1206)
 Marie I (or Mary), countess consort of Boulogne (d. 1182)
 William of Newburgh, English historian and writer (d. 1198)
 Xia (Shenfu), Chinese empress consort (d. 1167)

Deaths 
 April 15 – Richard Fitz Gilbert de Clare, Norman nobleman
 May 24 – Hugues de Payens, French nobleman and knight 
 November 15 – Leopold III, margrave of Austria (b. 1073)
 November 21 – William de Corbeil, archbishop of Canterbury
 December 14 – Harald IV (Servant of Christ), king of Norway 
 Abraham bar Hiyya, Spanish mathematician and astronomer 
 Jutta von Sponheim, German noblewoman and abbes (b. 1091)
 Gwenllian ferch Gruffydd, Welsh princess of Deheubarth
 Mael Isa Mac Mael Coluim, Irish monk and chronologist
 Wanyan Zonghan, Chinese nobleman and general (b. 1080)
 William VI, count of Auvergne and Velay (b. 1096)
 Zayn al-Din Gorgani, Persian physician (b. 1041)

References

Sources